Parinari argenteo-sericea is a tree of Borneo in the family Chrysobalanaceae. The specific epithet  is from the Latin meaning "silvery silky", referring to the pubescence of the inflorescence and flowers.

Description
The brown bark is lenticellate.

Distribution and habitat
Parinari argenteo-sericea is endemic to Borneo where it is confined to Sabah. Its habitat is lowland forests from sea-level to  altitude and forests along rivers and streams.

References

argenteo-sericea
Trees of Borneo
Endemic flora of Borneo
Flora of Sabah
Plants described in 1965
Taxonomy articles created by Polbot
Taxobox binomials not recognized by IUCN